USS Dace (SS-247), a Gato-class submarine, was the first submarine of the United States Navy to be named for any of several small North American fresh-water fishes of the carp family.

Construction and commissioning
Dace′s keel was laid down by the Electric Boat Company of Groton, Connecticut, 22 July 1942. She was launched on 25 April 1943, sponsored by Mrs O. P. Robertson, and commissioned on 23 July 1943, Lieutenant Commander Joseph F. Enright in command.

Service history

United States Navy

World War II

1943
Departing New London, Connecticut on 7 September 1943, Dace arrived at Pearl Harbor on 3 October, and 17 days later sailed on her first war patrol, bound for the southeast coast of Honshū and the approaches to Nagoya. On 7 November, she made her first contact with the enemy, damaging a freighter with torpedoes. Alert action by patrol craft prevented Dace from continuing her attack. She returned to Midway Island to refit from 11 December – 7 January 1944.

1944
On her second war patrol, Dace cruised the shipping lanes south of Truk. On the night of 26 January, she contacted a large tanker, guarded by two escorts. She fired a spread of torpedoes, heard five explosions, and broke off the contact to avoid the pursuit of the escort. The cause of the explosion is unknown as Japanese records show no ship damaged in that area on that date. After refueling at Tulagi on 2–3 February, Dace continued her patrol close to Truk during carrier air raids there on 16–17 February. On 25 February, she arrived at Milne Bay, New Guinea, for refit.

Dace put to sea on her third war patrol on 18 March, and two days later embarked a group of commandos at Langemak Bay. For the next week, she scouted the coast around Hollandia (currently known as Jayapura), New Guinea, landing the commando parties and taking them back on board at night. She refueled at Manus Island on 27–28 March, and sailed on for her assigned patrol area. On 13 May, Dace put into Brisbane, Australia, for refit.

Daces fourth war patrol – from 13 June – 12 August – found her refueling at Manus on 20–21 June, and sailing on to patrol the Mindanao coast in Davao Gulf. Enemy contacts were made, but were too small to be worthwhile targets. On 9 July, Dace scored at least three hits on a large transport whose two escorts dropped a total of 43 depth charges, badly shaking the submarine but causing little physical damage. A reconnaissance mission took her into Sarangani Bay on 16 July, and ten days later, she pursued a smoke contact visible on the horizon for a full day, eight times being forced down to avoid detection by patrolling aircraft. That night, she reestablished contact and just after midnight on 27 July, Dace launched an attack, firing ten torpedoes into a convoy of three merchantmen, sinking the tanker Kyoei Maru No. 2 (1,157 tons) before being forced to dive when one of the escorts tried to ram and began a depth charge attack. On 31 July, Dace sank a small freighter and the next day received another depth charging after an attack on a well escorted freighter. With all torpedoes expended, Dace put in at Manus on 6 August, and sailed on to Brisbane, arriving on 12 August.

Dace cleared Brisbane on 1 September on her fifth and most successful war patrol. She topped up her fuel tanks at Darwin, Australia on 10 September, and sailed for the exacting task of sweeping mines in Palawan Passage and Balabac Strait. From 27 September – 3 October, she put in at Mios Woendi to repair her gyrocompass, returning to her patrol area on 10 October. Four days later, she attacked a convoy of seven ships, sinking two and heavily damaging a third.

She now joined  in an action which brought both submarines the Navy Unit Commendation. On 23 October, they contacted the Japanese Center Force approaching the Palawan Passage for the attack on the Leyte landings. Since the location of this Japanese force had been unknown for several days, the contact report reported by Dace and Darter was significant. The two submarines closed the task force, and Darter attacked first, sinking  and damaging . Dace followed with a torpedo attack that sank , then went deep to avoid counterattacking destroyers. Continuing to track their target, hoping for a chance to finish off Takao, the two submarines worked through the Palawan Passage. Darter ran aground. With the area full of searching enemy ships, Dace took Darters men off, then fired torpedoes at her to destroy her. Before diving to avoid a patrolling Japanese aircraft, which had bombed Darter. Dace sailed on for Fremantle, Western Australia, arriving on 6 November.

Dace cleared Fremantle on 2 December on her sixth war patrol. She scouted along the Singapore-Hong Kong shipping lane, then sailed on to mine the channel between Palau Gambir and the mainland. Finishing that task on 16 December, Dace heard loud explosions from the mined area late in the afternoon. Three days later, while preparing to attack an eight-ship convoy, Dace was violently shaken by four depth charges or bombs. She went deep, hitting bottom, and while waiting there for the escorts to break off their attack, she was bumped, turned, scraped, and clanked along the bottom by the strong current. Somehow the enemy did not detect her and the sub was able to surface later, repair minor damage, and sail on to patrol farther north. On 28 December, she sank Nosaki and damaged a freighter in the same convoy. She put in at Saipan for fuel on 17 January 1945, and reached Pearl Harbor on 28 January.

1945
After a West Coast overhaul, Dace sailed from Pearl Harbor on 25 May 1945 on her seventh war patrol. She fueled at Midway on 29 May, and entered her patrol area in the Kurile Islands on 7 June.  Battle Stations Surfaced on two Japanese ships both sunk through gun action. 1 Luger and 1 Sea truck on 8 June.  Again, the next day two Japanese ships were taken out, a freighter and a destroyer. Here, she sank two sailing ships by gunfire, then headed into the Sea of Okhotsk. On 10 June, she detected a large freighter and a small tanker sailing through the fog. Coming into attacking position, Dace saw the convoy also included three escorts, but continued to close the freighter, firing her first spread at only . She swung to fire at the tanker as the freighter, Hakuyo Maru (1,391 GRT), exploded and sank, then was confronted by an escort apparently planning to ram. Dace launched a torpedo "down the throat" of the escort, and plunged deep. A severe depth charging followed, after which Dace fired again at the escort. She returned to Midway on 25 July, and sailed on to Saipan on 13 August, preparing for her eighth war patrol. She was there when the war ended.

Post-war
With the end of hostilities, Dace was ordered back to Pearl Harbor, and on 5 October 1945 arrived at New London. She was placed in commission in reserve at Portsmouth Naval Shipyard on 15 January 1946, and was towed to New London, where she was placed out of commission in reserve on 12 February 1947.

Recommissioned on 8 August 1951, Dace operated from New London along the Eastern Seaboard and in the Caribbean Sea until placed in commission in reserve at New London on 31 December 1953. She was placed out of commission in reserve at Portsmouth Naval Shipyard on 15 January 1954 for extensive modernization, then was recommissioned on 22 October 1954. After training men of the Marina Militare, she was decommissioned at New London on 31 January 1955, and transferred the same day to Italy under the Military Assistance Program.

Leonardo da Vinci (S 510)
Ex-Dace was commissioned in the Marina Militare Italiana (Italian Navy) as Leonardo da Vinci (S 510). Originally to be lent to Italy for five years, this arrangement was extended by five years in 1959 and extended for yet another five years, twice. Dace was stricken from the Naval Vessel Register on 15 October 1972 and returned to the United States Navy; Leonardo da Vinci was deleted from the Italian Navy the following year.

Fate

Ex-Dace was sold for scrapping on 1 April 1975.

Awards
In addition to the Navy Unit Commendation, Dace received seven battle stars during her seven war patrols, the last five of which were designated as "successful." She is credited with having sunk 28,689 tons of Japanese shipping.

References

External links

Kill record: USS Dace
Launched of USS Dace (SS-247) on YouTube

Gato-class submarines
Ships built in Groton, Connecticut
1943 ships
World War II submarines of the United States
Cold War submarines of the United States
Gato-class submarines of the Italian Navy